The Rowing Competition at the 2005 Mediterranean Games was held in the Cuevas del Almanzora Canal in Almería, Spain from 30 June to 2 July 2005.

Medalists

Men's events

Women's events

Medal table

References
2005 Mediterranean Games report at the International Committee of Mediterranean Games (CIJM) website

M
Sports at the 2005 Mediterranean Games
 
Rowing competitions in Spain